War and Peace, subtitled Game of the Napoleonic Wars: 1805–1815, is a board wargame published by Avalon Hill in 1980 that simulates ten years of Napoleonic wars.

Description
War and Peace is a multi-player strategic war game that simulates the Napoleonic Wars from 1805 to 1815 through ten separate scenarios.

Components
4-piece 16" x 44" hex grid map scaled at 40 mi (64 km) per hex
1000 counters
24-page rulebook
two playing aid cards
two 6-sided dice

Scenarios
The game is divided into nine scenarios:
 Austerlitz, 180: Napoleon must overwhelm Mack's forces at Ulm, then march on Vienna and defeat the Russo-Austrian forces.
 Jena to Friedland, 1806–07: Napoleon must overwhelm the Prussian forces in Saxony, but must then conquer the whole of Prussia by the following summer – the Russians can win by holding Warsaw or Konigsberg.
 Wagram, 1809: A resurgent Austria invades Bavaria in conjunction with a German rising and a British landing at Walcheren Island. Napoleon, returning from Spain, must defeat all these and march on Vienna again.
 Napoleon in Russia, 1812: Napoleon invades Russia with vast forces. 
 The War of Liberation, 1813: For the first time Napoleon has to take on Russia, Prussia and Austria at the same time.
 Napoleon at Bay, 1814: With the tiny remnants of his army, Napoleon tries to keep the Allies out of Paris.
 Waterloo, 1815: The famous battle
 The Peninsular War, 1808–1814: The French Marshals try to capture every city from Spanish and Portuguese militia and partisans, the latter aided by the small British Army under Wellington. 
 Spain: 1811–1814: A continuation of the previous scenario 
 Grand Campaign Game covering the entire period of 1805 to 1815.

Several more scenarios were published in various issues of The General.

Gameplay

 French Turn
Attrition Phase: Forces are reduced in size to represent the effects of disease and desertion
Alliance Phase: Diplomacy allows nations to ally with one another. 
Reinforcement Phase 
Movement Phase
Combat Phase

 Non-French Turn
Attrition Phase
Alliance Phase
Reinforcement Phase
Movement Phase
Combat Phase

 Advance the Turn Marker

Supply
A unit must trace supply to a major city through a chain of friendly strength points up to 3 hexes long.

Naval Rules
They are used only in the campaign game and consist of blockades of ports and skirmishes per sea zone (Baltic, North Sea, Atlantic and Mediterranean). There is a separate chart to see what happens when fleets come together.

Publication history
War and Peace was designed by Mark McLaughlin and published by Avalon Hill in 1980 in a boxed set with cover art by Denis Dighton.

After the demise of Avalon Hill, the rights to the game were acquired by One Small Step Games, which reprinted it in 2020, with a redrawn map and counters, and new scenarios of the Italian Campaign of 1796–7, the Egyptian Campaign of 1798 and the Marengo Campaign of 1800.

Reception
In Issue 26 of Phoenix, David Mylie notes "If you prefer strategic games or are interested in the Napoleonic period, War and Peace is well worth investigation." 

War and Peace was chosen for inclusion in the 2007 book Hobby Games: The 100 Best. Fantasy author R. A. Salvatore commented, "I've played them all and that's the one that had me lying in bed for hours and hours, working up multi-turn strategies for blasting my enemy's supply lines, or creating a back-alley run to Paris. That's the game, with its simple elegance yet multitude of tactics, that offered to me exactly the right amount of information to juggle. Neither overwhelming nor underwhelming, too hot nor too cold, too big nor too small, too soft nor too hard, War and Peace fit this duck's bill."

Awards
At the 1981 Charles S. Roberts Awards, War and Peace was a finalist for "Best Pre-Twentieth Century Game of 1980."

Other reviews
 Fire & Movement No. 25
 Boardgamer Vol. 8, No. 3
 Casus Belli No. 17 (Oct 1983)
Moves #52, p11-12

References

External links
 Deer Valley Game Company contains extensive errata, updates, and fixes.
 Grognards.com, a provider of wargame materials
 Grognards.com file listing provides a fix for the two player version of the Campaign Game.

Avalon Hill games
Board games introduced in 1980
Napoleonic Wars board wargames
War and Peace
World conquest board games